Xiāo’áo (died 758 BC) was from 763 to 758 BC the monarch of the state of Chu during the early Spring and Autumn period of ancient China.  He was born Xiong Kan and Xiao'ao was his posthumous title.

Like other early Chu rulers, Xiao'ao held the hereditary noble rank of viscount that was first granted to his ancestor Xiong Yi by King Cheng of Zhou.

Xiao'ao succeeded his father Ruo'ao, who died in 764 BC.  After a six-year reign he was succeeded by his son Fenmao.

References

Monarchs of Chu (state)
8th-century BC Chinese monarchs
758 BC deaths
Year of birth unknown